Ganga is a 1965 Bhojpuri film directed by Kundan Kumar.

References

External links

1965 films
1960s Bhojpuri-language films